The 2017 Cavan Intermediate Football Championship was the 53rd edition of Cavan GAA's premier Gaelic football tournament for intermediate graded clubs in County Cavan, Ireland. The tournament consists of 14 teams, with the winner representing Cavan in the Ulster Intermediate Club Football Championship.

The championship starts with a league stage and then progresses to a knock out stage. The draw for the group stages of the championship were made on 10 April 2017.

Shercock won the championship by beating Ballyhaise in the final.

Team Changes
The following teams have changed division since the 2016 championship season.

To Championship
Promoted from 2016 Cavan Junior Football Championship
  Cornafean - (Junior Champions)
Relegated from 2016 Cavan Senior Football Championship
  Ballyhaise - (Relegation play-off Losers)
  Denn - (Relegation play-off Losers)
  Killeshandra - (Relegation play-off Losers)

From Championship
Promoted to 2017 Cavan Senior Football Championship
  Arva - (Intermediate Champions)
Relegated to 2017 Cavan Junior Football Championship
  Drumalee - (Relegation play-off Losers)
  Drung - (Relegation play-off Losers)
  Templeport - (Relegation play-off Losers)

League stage

Round 1

Round 2

Round 3

Round 4

League play-offs

Knock-Out Stage

Quarter-finals

Semi-finals

Final

Relegation play-offs

References

External links
 Official Cavan GAA Website

Cavan Intermediate
Cavan GAA Football championships